Gelileh-ye Javid (also Romanized as Gelīleh-ye Jāvīd; also known as Gelīleh) is a village in Jowzar Rural District, in the Central District of Mamasani County, Fars Province, Iran. At the 2006 census, its population was 76, in 20 families.

References 

Populated places in Mamasani County